Neleus (Ancient Greek: Νηλεύς) was a mythological king of Pylos. In some accounts, he was also counted as an Argonaut instead of his son, Nestor.

Family 
Neleus was the son of Poseidon and Tyro. According to Pausanias, Neleus was the son of Cretheus, King of Iolcus, who was himself a son of Aeolus. Neleus had a brother called Pelias. 

With Chloris, Neleus was the father of Pero, Periclymenus, Alastor, Chomius, Asterius, Deimachus, Epilaus, Eurybius, Eurymenes, Evagoras, Phrasius, Pylaon, Taurus and Nestor. Some say that Chloris was mother only of three of Neleus' sons (Nestor, Periclymenus and Chromius), whereas the rest were his children by different women, but other accounts explicitly disagree with the statement. Otherwise, the mother of Nestor was called Polymede.

Mythology 
Tyro was married to Cretheus (with whom she had three sons, Aeson, Pheres, and Amythaon), though she loved Enipeus, a river god. She pursued Enipeus, who refused her advances. One day, Poseidon, filled with lust for Tyro, disguised himself as Enipeus. From their union were born Pelias and Neleus, twin boys. Tyro exposed her sons on a mountain, but they were found and raised by a maid.

When they reached adulthood, Pelias and Neleus found their mother Tyro and then killed her stepmother, Sidero, for having mistreated her. Sidero tried to hide in a temple to Hera but Pelias killed her anyway, earning himself Hera's undying hatred. Neleus and Pelias then fought for the crown, and Neleus was banished to Messenia. There he was welcomed by his cousin Aphareus who gave him the maritime part of the land where he settled and established his palace. Neleus eventually became King of Pylos.

Heracles later asked Neleus to cleanse him of a blood-debt, but was refused. In retaliation, he killed Neleus and his sons, except for Nestor.

Notes

References 

 Apollodorus, The Library with an English Translation by Sir James George Frazer, F.B.A., F.R.S. in 2 Volumes, Cambridge, MA, Harvard University Press; London, William Heinemann Ltd. 1921. ISBN 0-674-99135-4. Online version at the Perseus Digital Library. Greek text available from the same website.
Diodorus Siculus, The Library of History translated by Charles Henry Oldfather. Twelve volumes. Loeb Classical Library. Cambridge, Massachusetts: Harvard University Press; London: William Heinemann, Ltd. 1989. Vol. 3. Books 4.59–8. Online version at Bill Thayer's Web Site
 Diodorus Siculus, Bibliotheca Historica. Vol 1-2. Immanel Bekker. Ludwig Dindorf. Friedrich Vogel. in aedibus B. G. Teubneri. Leipzig. 1888–1890. Greek text available at the Perseus Digital Library.
 Gaius Julius Hyginus, Fabulae from The Myths of Hyginus translated and edited by Mary Grant. University of Kansas Publications in Humanistic Studies. Online version at the Topos Text Project.
 Pausanias, Description of Greece with an English Translation by W.H.S. Jones, Litt.D., and H.A. Ormerod, M.A., in 4 Volumes. Cambridge, MA, Harvard University Press; London, William Heinemann Ltd. 1918. . Online version at the Perseus Digital Library
Pausanias, Graeciae Descriptio. 3 vols. Leipzig, Teubner. 1903.  Greek text available at the Perseus Digital Library.
 Publius Ovidius Naso, Metamorphoses translated by Brookes More (1859-1942). Boston, Cornhill Publishing Co. 1922. Online version at the Perseus Digital Library.
 Publius Ovidius Naso, Metamorphoses. Hugo Magnus. Gotha (Germany). Friedr. Andr. Perthes. 1892. Latin text available at the Perseus Digital Library.

Further reading 

Douglas Frame 2009: Hippota Nestor: Washington, DC: Center for Hellenic Studies 
Douglas Frame 1978: The Myth of Return in Early Greek Epic, New Haven: Yale University Press.
Keith Dickson 1995: Nestor: Poetic Memory in Greek Epic: NY: Garland Publishers.
Keith Dickson 1993: "Nestor Among the Sirens," Oral Tradition 8/1: 21–58. 
Richard R. Martin 2012: Review of Douglas Frame Hippota Nestor 2009 in American Journal of Philology (AJP) 133.4 (Winter 2012): 687-692
Hanna Roisman 2005: "Nestor the Good Counselor," Classical Quarterly 55: 17-38 
Victoria Pedrick 1983: :The Paradignatic Nature of Nestor's Speech,: Transactions and Proceedings of the American Philological Assn. (TAPA) 113: 55–68.
R.M. Frazer 1971: “Nestor's Generations, Iliad 2.250-2” Glotta 49:216-8; 
V.C. Mathews 1987: “Kaukonian Dyme: Antimachus fr.27-8 and the text of Homer,” Eranos 85: 91–7.
Jack L. Davis (ed) 1998: Sandy Pylos: An Archaeological History from Nestor to Navarino. Austin: University of Texas Press. 
William G. Loy 1970: Land of Nestor: A Physical Geography of the Southwest Peloponnesos: Washington, DC. National Academy of Sciences. 
Carl Blegen and Marion Rawson (ed) 1966: Palace of Nestor at Pylos in Western Messenia for University of Cincinnati by Princeton University Press.

Kings of Pylos
Kings in Greek mythology
Family of Salmoneus
Children of Poseidon
Demigods in classical mythology
Characters from Iolcus
Mythology of Pylos
Mythology of Heracles
Fictional twins